This is an incomplete List of ghost towns in Virginia.

 Bigler's Mill (York County)
 Ca Ira (Cumberland County)
 Canada (Charlottesville)
 Carvins Cove
 Elko Tract
 Falling Creek
 Hanover Town
 Henricus
 Hickory Ridge
 Howrytown
 Jamestown
 Joplin
 Kopp
 Lackey
 Lignite
 Lorraine
 Magruder
 Matildaville
 South Lowell
 Warwick
 Westham

Notes and references

 
Virginia
Ghost towns